The 1999 Missouri Valley Conference men's soccer season was the 9th season of men's varsity soccer in the conference.

The 1999 Missouri Valley Conference Men's Soccer Tournament was hosted by Bradley and won by Missouri State.

Teams

MVC Tournament

See also 

 Missouri Valley Conference
 Missouri Valley Conference men's soccer tournament
 1999 NCAA Division I men's soccer season
 1999 in American soccer

References 

Missouri Valley Conference
1999 NCAA Division I men's soccer season